Dimitar Georgiev Tsenovski (born 4 June 1984) is a Bulgarian former footballer.

References

External links

1984 births
Living people
Bulgarian footballers
Association football midfielders
Bulgarian expatriate footballers
Expatriate footballers in Belarus
First Professional Football League (Bulgaria) players
Second Professional Football League (Bulgaria) players
PFC Lokomotiv Plovdiv players
PFC Rodopa Smolyan players
FC Spartak Plovdiv players
FC Torpedo-BelAZ Zhodino players
FC Lyubimets players
FC Botev Vratsa players